Andreas Nischwitz (born 1 April 1957) is a former West German pair skater. He was born in Leinfelden, Germany. With partner Susanne Scheibe, he won the gold medal at the German Figure Skating Championships in 1977 and 1978, finishing eighth at both the European Figure Skating Championships and World Figure Skating Championships in both years.  He then teamed with Christina Riegel and won the German title three straight years, starting in 1979.  They finished eighth at the 1980 Winter Olympics, and the following year, the pair won the silver medal at the European Championships and the bronze at the World Championships.

Results

With Scheibe

With Riegel

References

1957 births
Living people
German male pair skaters
Olympic figure skaters of West Germany
Figure skaters at the 1980 Winter Olympics
World Figure Skating Championships medalists
European Figure Skating Championships medalists
Sportspeople from Stuttgart (region)
People from Esslingen (district)